Uukwangali (also Ukwangali, Kwangali, and Kwangari) is a traditional kingdom of the Kavango people in northern Namibia. Its capital is Nkurenkuru, its  Hompa (king) is Eugene Siwombe Kudumo.

References 

 World Statesmen.org

History of Namibia
Kavango people